Claudia Ochoa Félix (15 January 1987 – 14 September 2019) was a social media personality. In 2014, a rumor spread on social media that she was a high-ranking leader of the murder squad Los Ántrax, a bloc of enforcers that operate as an armed wing of the Sinaloa Cartel. After their leader José Rodrigo Aréchiga Gamboa (alias "Chino Ántrax") was arrested, Ochoa Félix was rumored to be one of the leaders. She denied the claims and her involvement in organized crime.

Social media presence
Ochoa Félix was known on social media for her resemblance to Kim Kardashian and had accounts on various social media sites, including Twitter, Facebook and Instagram. Ochoa Félix's photos revealed her luxurious lifestyle, which showed her with sports cars, planes, yachts and various weapons.

Death 
Ochoa Félix was found dead in her private residence in Culiacán on the 14th of September 2019, due to apparent pulmonary aspiration caused by a drug overdose. The previous night she had been seen going home with an unidentified man after attending a party in the city centre. The morning after the unidentified man raised an alarm due to Félix not responding, she was pronounced dead at the scene. 

Many people began to rumour online that Félix had been assassinated due to her affiliations with the infamous Los Ántrax squad and the Sinaloa Cartel. Claudia Félix fans assure that she "was Drake's crush", who "followed each other" on social networks and "sent messages", they say. When she died, Drake and Claudia Ochoa Félix were in Twitter trends.

See also
Mexican Drug War

References

1987 births
2019 deaths
Drug-related deaths in Mexico
Social media influencers